Nikita Vladlenovich Yermakov (born 19 January 2003) is a Russian football player who plays for PFC CSKA Moscow.

Club career
He made his debut in the Russian Premier League for PFC CSKA Moscow on 16 July 2022 in a game against FC Ural Yekaterinburg.

Career statistics

References

External links
 
 
 
 

2003 births
Living people
Russian footballers
Russia youth international footballers
Russia under-21 international footballers
Association football midfielders
PFC CSKA Moscow players
Russian Premier League players